Stična Mansion is a mansion house located at 34 Old Square in Ljubljana, the capital of Slovenia. The mansion was built between 1628 and 1630, with the purpose of accommodating the abbots of the Cistercian monastery in the village of Stična. Since then, it has undergone several alterations, notably the façade was reworked in the early 18th century. In front of Stična Mansion stands the Hercules Fountain.

References

External links

Mansions in Ljubljana
Houses completed in 1630
Center District, Ljubljana
Baroque architecture in Ljubljana
1630 establishments in the Holy Roman Empire